Qaleh Sefid (also Romanized as Qal‘eh Sefīd and Qal‘ehsefīd) is a village in Dalaki Rural District, in the Central District of Dashtestan County, Bushehr Province, Iran. At the 2006 census, its population was 1,751, in 375 families.

References 

Populated places in Dashtestan County